The Universel Murad Hassil is an international Universal Sufi place of worship known as a "Universel" located in Katwijk aan Zee in the Netherlands. Its associated amphitheatre situated in the dunes has frequently been used as a public exhibition space and is a cultural attraction for the local municipality.

History
In 1969, a structure designed by the Dutch architect S.J. of Embden was built on the place where, in the summer of 1922, Inayat Khan reported having a 'spiritual experience' and proclaimed the place holy.

The land was bought by the municipality of Katwijk from the State of the Netherlands in 1947. The lot is distinct from the territory of the Dutch armed forces bought by the municipality in 1954. The Murad Hassil trust acquired a perpetual lease from the municipality in 1956 through the Council of State. A building permit was granted by the municipality on 25 juli 1967. 

Work on the building was announced in January 1968,
and commenced in April 1969. The official opening was Saturday July 4th 1970.

The temple was built by construction company Van Rhijn Katwijk, which was in financial difficulties at the time. New employees were hired for the realization of the project, which cost about ƒ500,000.

The construction used concrete blocks and glass bricks, with the cupola made of double-walled transparent plastic.

In 1984 the Royal Dutch Touring Club and Tourism Society deemed the temple an attractive "place of interest", and the building was included in the architecture guide of Rijnland region published by the Dutch Association of Architectural Firms.
In 2009 a quartets card game was published with one card featuring the building. There is also an associated amphitheatre for 335 people located nearby in a dune valley. 

In 2014 the building was nominated for monument status by the municipal heritage committee. It has been open to the public on European Heritage Days.

Usage
Every year, the 'Sufi summer school' takes place in this temple, and many Universal Sufis from around the world visit the temple each summer. 

There were plans to build accommodation to stay overnight for participants, however, in 1987 the majority of the local council for spatial planning was against extension of the complex.

Public events
The Universal Worship Service, brotherhood days and other meetings take place in the temple as well as several traditional music concerts. These are open to the general public.

Exhibition space
The temple has been used as a public exhibition space.

Stage
The policy of the Public Benefit Organisation responsible for the temple states the temple can be made available to others for activities only if those activities are harmonious with the spiritual atmosphere of the temple.

Other public activities

Interactions

Local community
In connection with vandalism in 1987 permission was obtained to build a guard house on the premises.

In 1988 a member of the local city council spoke out against the colour of the outer walls of the temple.
In 1989 the originally sober concrete brick walls were covered with a layer of plaster in various pastel colours.

Religious groups
In Katwijk there are predominantly Dutch Reformed Churches. In 1969 local Dutch Reformed conversation circles discussed the appearance of the Sufi temple. At the opening of the temple in 1970 the praeses and secretary of the synods of the Dutch Reformed Churches (NHK) and the Reformed Churches in the Netherlands (GKN) were invited.

Environment
For the disposal of waste a connection has been made to a conduit especially made for the purpose.

According to a study by the province of Zuid-Holland the location of the Sufi Temple does not overlap with the location of habitat types or habitats with a conservation objective.

See also
 Universel in Bothell, WA, USA
 Universel in Suresnes, France
 Sufi temple in Cape Town, South Africa
 Dargah of Inayat Khan in New Delhi, India

References

External links 

 Official website

Inayati Order
Religious buildings and structures in the Netherlands
Katwijk
Buildings and structures in South Holland
Event venues in the Netherlands